Ultraviolet is the fourth and final studio album by All About Eve. It was the only album that the band released with MCA. Despite quite positive reviews at the time this album was not commercially successful, reaching only #36 on the UK Albums Chart. The two singles only reached, respectively, #38 and #57 in the UK Singles Chart. As a consequence of this, the band was dropped by MCA shortly afterward.

"Outshine the Sun" was frequently used at the band's gigs for a finale. "Some Finer Day" was the last single released by the band for twelve years, "Let Me Go Home" being the next one in 2004.

Track listing
"Phased"
"Yesterday Goodbye"
"Mine"
"Freeze"
"The Things He Told Her"
"Infrared"
"I Don't Know"
"Dream Butcher"
"Some Finer Day"
"Blindfolded Visionary"
"Outshine the Sun"

Personnel
Andy Cousin - bass, 12-string guitar (tracks 7 and 11)
Mark Price - percussion, drums, sound effect (lunar siren, track 1)
Julianne Regan - voice, guitars (track 7), bass (tracks 7 and 11); mellotron, piano, sitar & Indian pipes (track 11)
Marty Willson-Piper - electric and acoustic guitars

References

External links

1992 albums
All About Eve (band) albums
MCA Records albums